William Chandler Crowe (born September 9, 1994) is an American professional baseball pitcher for the Pittsburgh Pirates of Major League Baseball (MLB). He previously played in MLB for the Washington Nationals.

Amateur career
Crowe attended Pigeon Forge High School in Sevier County, Tennessee. The Cleveland Indians selected him in the 31st round of the 2013 Major League Baseball draft. He declined to sign, instead of attending the University of South Carolina, where he pitched for the South Carolina Gamecocks.

While at South Carolina, in April 2015, Crowe tore the ulnar collateral ligament in his right throwing elbow and underwent Tommy John surgery performed by Dr. James Andrews. He spent the next two years rehabbing with fellow Gamecocks pitcher Cody Morris, who described Crowe as "a mentor" to him during the process even though Crowe had his elbow procedure just a month sooner. Crowe made his return to pitching on June 1, 2016, starting the home opener for the Lexington County Blowfish and showing off a sharp slider and a fastball that reached 95 mph. The Indians again selected him in the 2016 MLB draft, using their 21st-round pick on him, but Crowe again did not sign, returning to South Carolina as a redshirt junior.

Crowe led the Gamecocks in strikeouts while posting a 3.41 ERA across 92⅓ innings in 2017 before being drafted with the 65th overall pick by the Nationals in the 2017 MLB Draft, who were known for selecting amateur players who had previously had or needed to undergo Tommy John surgery. Crowe received a $946,500 signing bonus from the Nationals, in line with the slot value of the selection.

Professional career

Washington Nationals
After Crowe's signing, MLB Prospect Watch ranked him as the Nationals' sixth-best prospect, with Baseball America listing him eighth. Crowe made his professional debut with the GCL Nationals, and after giving up two earned runs in 3.2 innings, was promoted to the Auburn Doubledays, where he finished the season, posting a 2.61 ERA with a 1.02 WHIP in seven games started. Crowe opened his season with the High-A Potomac Nationals in 2018 by winning eleven straight decisions, earning a berth in the Carolina League All-Star Game. He was promoted to the Class-AA Harrisburg Senators midway through the season, losing all five of his decisions at the higher level. After the season, Crowe was named a co-Minor League Pitcher of the Year (with Ben Braymer) by the Nationals.

In 2019, Crowe was invited to participate in his first major league spring training as a non-roster invitee, giving him the opportunity to work with veteran Nationals pitchers Patrick Corbin, Max Scherzer, and Stephen Strasburg, something he described to The Washington Post as "like getting a PhD in pitching". He was ranked before the season as the fifth-best prospect in the Nationals organization by MLB Pipeline, and the team's second-best pitching prospect behind Mason Denaburg.

Crowe made his Major League Baseball debut on August 22, 2020, starting the second game of a doubleheader against the Miami Marlins.

Pittsburgh Pirates
On December 24, 2020, the Nationals traded Crowe and Eddy Yean to the Pittsburgh Pirates for Josh Bell. On September 20, 2022, Crowe delivered a pitch that Aaron Judge hit for his 60th home run of the season, tying Babe Ruth for the second-most in New York Yankees history.

Pitching style
Crowe throws both four-seam and two-seam fastballs, reaching  as of 2018. He complements his fastballs with a changeup, curveball, and slider. In his downtime, Crowe studies baseball analytics.

Personal life
Crowe and his wife, Hilary, married in December 2018. His great-great uncle is Red Ruffing, a Hall of Fame pitcher buried in Bedford Heights, Ohio.

References

External links

1994 births
Living people
People from Sevierville, Tennessee
Baseball players from Tennessee
Major League Baseball pitchers
Washington Nationals players
Pittsburgh Pirates players
South Carolina Gamecocks baseball players
Gulf Coast Nationals players
Auburn Doubledays players
Potomac Nationals players
Harrisburg Senators players
Fresno Grizzlies players
Indianapolis Indians players